Víctor Larco Herrera Avenue is one of the main avenues of Trujillo city, located on the north coast of Peru. Named after the famous philanthropist Victor Larco Herrera by this via  urbanistically joins Trujillo and Víctor Larco  districts. It is the main via of Victor Larco and one of the most important in Trujillo. It begins in the west of the city and starts from the resort of Buenos Aires and runs till the Historic Centre of Trujillo, covers many blocks which have numerous shopping centers, of education, health, regional government agencies, etc.

Main institutions
 Municipality of Víctor Larco Herrera, in the zone of Buenos Aires.
 Cesar Vallejo University, on the block 17.
 UCV Satelital located in front of Cesar Vallejo University.
 SUNARP (National Superintendency of Public Registries).
 RENIEC (National Registry of Identification and Civil status), in the intersection with Ayacucho street in Vista Alegre.

Localities joined by Larco avenue
Buenos Aires
Vista Alegre
Historic Centre of Trujillo
San Andrés V
California
San Andres I
Los Pinos
La Merced

Tourístic points
Buenos Aires beach (West)
Historic Centre of Trujillo
Paseo de Aguas

See also
Trujillo
España Avenue
Marinera Festival
Trujillo Spring Festival
Las Delicias beach
Huanchaco
Santiago de Huamán
Victor Larco Herrera District

References

External links
Location of Trujillo city (Wikimapia)

Media

Gallery of images
Cultural Promotion Center of Trujillo

Streets in Trujillo, Peru